Thiess may refer to:

Thiess (surname)
 Thiess of Kaltenbrun, Livonian werewolf
 Thiess Pty Ltd, an Australian mining services company
 Thiess Contractors Indonesia, the regional subsidiary of Thiess

See also
Thies (disambiguation)
 Theiss (disambiguation)
 Thiessen (disambiguation)
 Theissen (disambiguation)